"Five More in a Row" is a 1990 single by Australian comedy team, The D-Generation. It was released in September 1990 and reached a peak position of number 37 on the ARIA Singles Chart. It was co-written by The D-Generation members, Santo Cilauro, Tony Martin, Rob Sitch, and Tom Gleisner. Music written and produced by Colin Setches and John Grant.

The song and its accompanying music video parodied five Australian music acts. They were: Max Q (Jason Stephens playing Michael Hutchence), Dragon (Mick Molloy playing Marc Hunter), Daryl Braithwaite (played by Sitch), Kate Ceberano (played by Kennedy), and Midnight Oil (Sitch playing Peter Garrett).

Track listing
 "Five More in a Row"	
 "Pissweak Courtroom Sketch"

Charts

References

1990 singles
Comedy songs
1990 songs
Mushroom Records singles